Ao Siam National Park (RTGS: Utthayan Haeng Chat Ao Siam) is a national park that is preparing to reopen in Thailand. It is an area on the western coast of the Gulf of Thailand covering the Pa Klang Ao Forest Park, Mae Ramphueng Forest Park, Koh Talu, Koh Sing, and Koh Sanghk, Bang Saphan District Prachuap Khiri Khan Province. Which the three islands are 8 kilometers from the coast, 6 kilometers, and 5 kilometers, respectively. There are also some areas located in the drafting area of the Ministry of Natural Resources and Environment (Thailand) regarding environmental protection measures in some areas of Thap Sakae District, Kui Buri District, Sam Roi Yot District, Mueang Prachuap Khiri Khan District, Bang Saphan District, and Bang Saphan Noi District Prachuap Khiri Khan Province.

Geography 
1. Pa Klang Ao Forest Park

Most of the area consists of large terrestrial forests with steep mountains and the surrounding area is connected to the sea on three sides. And in the mangrove forest part of the Mae Ramphueng Canal is the part that consists of mud and beach. It has a total area of approximately 4,500 rai.

2. Mae Ramphueng Forest Park

Most of the area is plain with sandy loam, making the topsoil very fertile. As a result, the coastal areas are not flooded in the rainy season. There are also large forests. with an area of approximately 1,200 rai 

3. Koh Talu, Koh Sing, and Koh Sanghk

 Koh Talu is an island in the Gulf of Thailand. It is about 8 kilometers from the coast of Prachuap Khiri Khan Province, covering an area of 1.178 square kilometers or about 736 rai, shaped like a whale, arranged from north to south. It is a rich natural resource, including terrestrial plants, marine plants, and coral reef ecosystems. These ecosystems are considered important areas of living things. In addition, Ao Siam National Park is open to tourists to do various activities, such as a snorkeling attraction, where Koh Talu is a beautiful snorkeling spot of Thailand.
 Koh Sing is a small island located about 5 kilometers from the coast of Prachuap Khiri Khan Province, with an area of approximately 0.016 square kilometers.
 Koh Sanghk is a small island located 6 kilometers from the coast of Prachuap Khiri Khan Province, with an area of approximately 0.018 square kilometers. The area around Koh Sanghk has natural resources that are important to various living things and is rich in coral reefs.

Climate 
Ao Siam National Park is an island area, partly located next to the Gulf of Thailand, resulting in the influence of the monsoon blowing in from the South China Sea, resulting in a long and heavy rainy season that runs from June–November of every year. It is also influenced by the northeast monsoon that blows in from the Andaman Sea, where the monsoon winds will collide with the Tenasserim Hills, resulting in the winter season from November–February, and the summer season runs from March–May. In which the summer will affect the overall water resources of the Ao Siam National Park, causing the water to be quite dry, therefore, the groundwater has to be drilled to bring the groundwater to be used, but the water quality will look like brackish water cannot be used for consumption.

Flora 
1. Pa Klang Ao Forest Park area

The plant community in the Pa Klang Ao Forest Park has plant characteristics that appear in the region of Malaysia. There is only one type of forest that is moist evergreen forest, which is detailed as follows: Moist evergreen forest  has a sandy loam soil condition, but due to the influence of rainfall from the South China Sea and the Andaman Sea, the Pa Klang Ao Forest Park is moist all year round. The most prominent plant is Dipterocarpus alatus, which is a plant with a height of 30–50 meters. There is also Syzygium grande, Adenanthera pavonina, Aphanamixis Polystachya, Toona ciliata, Pterospermum, Acronychia pedunculata, Knema globularia, Mallotus philippensis, Ixora coccinea, Anaxagorea phaeocarpa, Licuala spinosa, Scleropyrum wallichianum, Uvaria grandiflora, Dracaena angustifolia, Neuropeltis, and Naravelia laurifolia scattered throughout the Pa Klang Ao Forest Park.

2. Mae Ramphueng Forest Park area

The plant community in the Mae Ramphueng Forest Park has characteristics of mixed plants that appear in the Indochina region and the India-Myanmar region. Four types of forest are beach forest, dry evergreen forest, mangrove forest, and peat swamp forest, which is detailed as follows:

 Beach forest  is influenced by the sea breeze that blows salt mist into the area. As a result, the plants are scattered in patches along the rocks along the coast and are salinity tolerant. The plants found are Cordia subcordata, Guettarda speciosa, Thespesia populnea, Scaevola taccada, Manilkara hexandra, Pandanus odorifer, Derris elliptica, Euphorbia lactea, Abrus precatorius, Tarlmounia elliptica, Volkameria inerme, Sarcostemma viminale, Azima sarmentosa, and Connarus agamae.
 Dry evergreen forest there is an evergreen forest structure similar to the dry evergreen forest in the Kui Buri National Park Prachuap Khiri Khan Province this will change the appearance of the plant species according to the elevation from the sea, making the plants more resistant to drought for a long time. The most prominent plant is Syzygium grande, Lannea coromandelica, Sindora siamensis, and Adenanthera pavonina, which is a plant with a height of 10–15 meters. There is also Garcinia, Koilodepas, Gardenia, Lepisanthes, Gonocaryum, Acronychia pedunculata, Pterospermum acerifolium, Bridelia micrantha, Siphonodon celastrineus, Chaetocarpus castanocarpus, Bixa orellana, Atalantia monophylla, Erythroxylum australe, Neolitsea dealbata, and Manilkara hexandra scattered throughout the Mae Ramphueng Forest Park.
 Mangrove forest is a plant society made up of many plants with evergreen leaves often found Rhizophora in the mouth of the sea and the area around the island with muddy soil scattered along the Gulf of Thailand from Trat Province down to Narathiwat Province.
 Peat swamp forest is the only wetland in Bang Saphan District Prachuap Khiri Khan Province. The water system is influenced by the sea, so there are both brackish and freshwater. Plants are found in areas near the coast where the plant society is similar to the swamp forest in Nakhon Si Thammarat Province. The most prominent plant is Stenochlaena palustris, which is the main structure of the forest. There is also Acrostichum aureum, Flagellaria indica, and Rhizophora mucronata scattered throughout the Mae Ramphueng Forest Park.

3. Koh Talu area

The plant community in the Koh Talu has characteristics of mixed plants that appear in the Indochina region and the Malaysia region. Three types of forest are beach forest, dry evergreen forest, and moist evergreen forest, which is detailed as follows:

 Beach forest found a plant society along the shores of sandy beaches influenced by sea breezes that bring in salty vapors. Some plants grow only in these ecological characteristics, scattered around or in a narrow line. It is home to many types of salt-tolerant plants, are Terminalia catappa, Cordia subcordata, Guettarda speciosa, Diospyros malabarica, Thespesia populnea, Pemphis acidula, Scaevola taccada, Heritiera littoralis, Manilkara hexandra, Calophyllum inophyllum, Excoecaria agallocha, Pandanus fascicularis, Colubrina asiatica, Sophora tomentosa, Diospyros ferrea, Ochrosia oppositifolia, Crinum asiaticum,  Abrus precatorius, Clerodendrum, Cassytha filformis, and Connarus.
 Dry evergreen on the area of Koh Talu, there is a forest structure that depends on the wind direction, which includes both parts with dense forest structure. It has a height of about 10–15 meters and the area is facing the wind, which has stunted plant conditions.
 Moist evergreen forest influenced by rainfall, the soil conditions are highly moist all year round. There is also a mountain range to the west of Koh Talu area, which is an important freshwater source on Koh Talu. Although it is unable to provide water in the form of creeks and streams due to the relatively small area, but provides water in the form of absorbent water that can be stored well underground.

Fauna 
From the survey of the biodiversity of animals in the ecological area of Koh Talu, the survey covered beach and forest areas on the island to obtain information on mammals, birds, reptiles and corals. The results are as follows:

Mammals

From the survey found that there are mammals in the family Pteropodidae is Pteropus hypomelanus and the family Sciuridae is Callosciurus caniceps. At the time of the survey, Callosciurus caniceps could only hear but not see, and the estimated number of Pteropus hypomelanus living on the island, according to survey estimates, was more than 100.

Birds

Bird surveys in Koh Talu area found a total of 11 bird species, of which 10 species are endemic and one species is migratory. The survey, which was done in late summer, did not find any migratory birds, which was assumed that these birds may use the island. Thalu is a winter residence.

Birds found in Koh Talu area are as follows:
barn swallow (Hirundo rustica),
Pacific reef heron (Egretta sacra),
Striated heron (Butorides striatus),
Red-wattled lapwing (Vanellus indicus),
Indian roller (Coracias benghalensis),
Greater coucal (Centropus sinensis), 
Asian koel (Eudynamys scolopacea),
Blue rock thrush (Monticola solitaries),
Brown-throated sunbird (Anthreptes malacensis),
and Olive-backed sunbird (Nectarinia jugularis)
Black-naped tern (Sterna sumatrana) 
and Bridled tern (Onychoprion anaethetus).

From bird surveys in the island area In the area of Koh Talu, it was found that the number and species of birds found were less than the Diversity index for the amount found. Which the frequency values found Egretta sacra, Nectarinia jugularis, Anthreptes malacensis, Coracias benghalensis, and Vanellus indicus it is the bird with seen most often.

Reptiles

From the reptiles survey In the area of Koh Talu, all 6 species are found. Reptiles found in the Koh Talu area are as follows:

Oriental garden lizard (Calortes versicolor)
Chrysopelea ornate (Chrysopelea ornata)
Ptyas carinata
Common house gecko (Hemidactylus frenatus)
Reticulated python (Python reticulatus)
and Eutropis multifasciata.

From a single survey, there may be other species that have not yet been seen in this survey. It is also speculated that Cardisoma carnifex may be seen, a type of crab in the Gecarcinidae family that lives on Koh Talu.

Corals

From survey data on coral reefs around Koh Talu, Koh Sing and Koh Sangkh, Prachuap Khiri Khan Province. A survey of coral reefs in Koh Talu, Koh Sing and Koh Sangkh revealed that the total coral reef area was 538,13 and 21 rai, respectively. It was found that most of the coral reefs at Koh Talu and Koh Sing had moderate levels, but Koh Sangkh has most of the coral reefs at the fertile level. Department of National Parks, Wildlife and Plant Conservation, which is responsible for managing marine national parks has recognized the importance of conserving important marine resources by declaring it a protected area. which is a breeding ground and habitat for many marine animals especially aquatic animals that are economically important.

Attractions 
1. Mae Ramphueng Forest Park

Mae Ramphueng Forest Park Mae Ramphueng Subdistrict Bang Saphan District Prachuap Khiri Khan Province With an area of approximately 4,483 rai, the Royal Forest Department announced the establishment of a forest park on 16 January 2002. Mae Ramphueng Forest Park is a suitable place to pitch a tent, but if anyone wants comfort there are many resorts. Nearby can choose a resort adjacent to Mae Ramphueng Forest Park or Mae Ramphueng Beach.

2. Mae Ramphueng Beach

Mae Ramphueng Beach is a beautiful and popular beach in Rayong. About 11 kilometers from the city, part of Khao Laem Ya National Park, located 500 meters from the park office, about 6 kilometers from Ban Phe, the white sandy beach. It is considered the longest beach on the eastern coast, with a length of 12 kilometers. scenic walk relax on the beach chair Sit and eat at a restaurant by the sea. If you want to stay overnight, there are many accommodations, resorts, and hotels on the beach to choose from. Mae Ramphueng beach shoreline faced severe Oil spill after the oil from Star Petroleum Refining Public Company Limited operated underwater pipeline leaked and washed on the beach.The beach was declared as disaster area followed by the incident.

3. Pa Klang Ao Forest Park

Pa Klang Ao Forest Park is located in the forest in the middle of the bay. Village No. 6, Mae Ramphueng Subdistrict, Bang Saphan District Prachuap Khiri Khan Province with an area of approximately 1,200 rai. By Pa Klang Ao Forest Park there are no lodges or camps available to tourists. If tourists wish to stay overnight, relax, or study for knowledge of nature Please bring your tent and prepare your food. By the way, the forest park has provided a place with toilets. To request permission to use the place directly with the staff at Pa Klang Ao Forest Park.

4. Koh Talu

Koh Talu, Bang Saphan Noi District Prachuap Khiri Khan Province With an area of approximately 1,500 rai with white sandy beaches, which is the island where Eretmochelys imbricata spawns every year during May–October. It is also a snorkeling site with much beautiful fish and a wide variety of corals. Suitable for nature lovers who enjoy snorkeling. It is an area with resorts, sandy beaches, and shady coconut trees to the east. Facing the sea, the distinctive symbol of Koh Talu is the Talu channel, which looks like a large hole through it. The two sides are hidden beneath the cliffs like stone bridges formed by wind erosion for thousands of years. Koh Talu can travel all year round, but the best season is from February–May. There are also three interesting bays on Koh Talu as follows:

 Ao Yai is 900 meters long and is the longest beach on Koh Talu. You can swim in the fine sand. and see coral from the beach It is home to Koh Talu Island Resort, the only accommodation on the island.
 Ao Muk is a small bay that is only 300 meters long, is filled with the serenity of coconut trees.
 Ao Thian is a small bay at the end of the island, can be reached on foot from Ao Yai. There are rocks scattered everywhere. This beach has no accommodation. so quiet most private.

Travel 
Access to the Ao Siam National Park area will be divided into 2 areas as follows:

1. Mae Ramphueng Forest Park and Pa Klang Ao Forest Park

 Travel by car takes the Petch Kasem Road route. From Bangkok to Bang Saphan District It has a distance of 370 kilometers and takes about 5 hours and 30 minutes.
 Travel by train from Hua Lamphong Railway Station Bangkok to Bang Saphan Train Station The distance is about 353 kilometers, the journey takes about 5 hours and 50 minutes.

2. Koh Talu, Koh Sing, and Koh Sangkhae

 Travel by car takes the Petchkasem Road route. From Bangkok to Bang Saphan District It has a distance of 370 kilometers and takes about 5 hours and 30 minutes. And from Bangkok to Bang Saphan Noi District It has a distance of 390 kilometers and takes about 5 hours and 25 minutes and from the pier, there will be a variety of travel services, both round trip and overnight at Koh Talu. It takes about 20 minutes to reach Koh Talu by speedboat.
 Travel by train from Hua Lamphong Railway Station Bangkok to Bang Saphan Train Station The distance is about 353 kilometers, the journey takes about 5 hours and 50 minutes.

References

External links 

 Official website of Ao Siam National Park
 Official Facebook page of Ao Siam National Park

IUCN Category II
National parks of Thailand
Geography of Prachuap Khiri Khan province
Tourist attractions in Prachuap Khiri Khan province